A list of films produced by the Turkish film industry in Turkey in 2009.

Highest-grossing films

Released films

January – June

July – December

See also 
 2009 in Turkey

References 

2009
Films
Turkey